Megastomia zijpi is a species of sea snail, a marine gastropod mollusk in the family Pyramidellidae, the pyrams and their allies.

Description
The length of the shell varies between 1.8 mm and 2.1 mm.

Distribution
This species occurs in the Atlantic Ocean off Mauritania.

References

 Peñas A. & Rolán E., 1999. La familia Pyramidellidae Gray, 1840 (Mollusca, Gastropoda, Heterostropha) en Africa Occidental. 4. los géneros Megastomia, Odostomia, Noemiamea y Syrnola. Iberus, suplemento 5: 1-150

External links
 To Encyclopedia of Life
 World Register of Marine Species

Pyramidellidae
Gastropods described in 1998
Invertebrates of West Africa